Hossein "Farzad" Zamehran is an Iranian football forward who plays for Nassaji in the Iran Pro League.

Club career
Zamehran started his professional career with Payam Mashhad in 2009 while he promoted to first team by Davoud Mahabadi. He made his debut for Payam in 2010–11 season. Later he moved to Siah Jamegan in Division 2. After shining with Mashadi side in Division 2, he joined Mes Sarcheshmeh. In summer 2013 he joined newly established side, Padideh. He was part of Padideh in promoting to Pro League in 2014. In 2014–15 season he failed in making any appearances for Padideh, so he joined to Siah Jamegan with a loan contract until end of the season in winter transfer window. He scored 4 times in 10 matches for Siah Jamegan and helped them to promoting to Pro League. In Summer 2015 he moved to Siah Jamegan permanently with a contract until 2016. He made his professional debut in 2-1 loss against Esteghlal on July 30, 2015 where he used as a substitute for Reza Enayati. In his 2nd appearance for Siah Jamegan, he scored against Naft Tehran in 1-0 win.
He scored a goal in match of his team  F.C. Nassaji Mazandaran against Tractor SC at minute 2:40, on 28 of June 2020, which is the fastest goal by Tractor SC in Iran Football league.

Club career statistics

Honours

Club
Padideh
Azadegan League: 2013–14

Siah Jamegan
Azadegan League: Runner-up 2014–15

References

External links
 Farzad Zamehran at IranLeague.ir

1992 births
Living people
Iranian footballers
Payam Mashhad players
Siah Jamegan players
Mes Sarcheshme players
Shahr Khodro F.C. players
Association football midfielders
Association football forwards
Nassaji Mazandaran players